Nick Broad was an English football nutritionist and worked for some of Britain's biggest football clubs including Blackburn Rovers, Birmingham City, Chelsea Football Club and in Paris, he worked for Paris St-Germain. Broad was a close friend of former Chelsea manager, Carlo Ancelotti. He graduated from Aberdeen University. Aged 38, he died on 19 January 2013 of an accidental traffic collision.

References

2013 deaths
English sports coaches
Sports scientists
Year of birth missing
British nutritionists
Alumni of the University of Aberdeen
Road incident deaths in France